Martin Heinze (born 5 January 1939) is a German wrestler. He competed at the 1960 Summer Olympics, the 1964 Summer Olympics and the 1968 Summer Olympics.

References

External links
 

1939 births
Living people
German male sport wrestlers
Olympic wrestlers of the United Team of Germany
Olympic wrestlers of East Germany
Wrestlers at the 1960 Summer Olympics
Wrestlers at the 1964 Summer Olympics
Wrestlers at the 1968 Summer Olympics
20th-century German people
21st-century German people